Jovan Milošević (born 31 July 2005) is a Serbian professional footballer who plays as a centre-forward for Serbian SuperLiga club Vojvodina. He will join Bundesliga club Stuttgart in July 2023.

sq:Jovan Milošević

Club career
On 10 July 2022, Milošević made his first-team debut for Vojvodina, replacing Nebojša Bastajić in the 65th minute in a 1:0 home win against Napredak Kruševac.

On 25 January 2023, it was officially announced that the striker would join Bundesliga side Stuttgart from the start of the 2023–24 season, signing a contract until June 2027 with the German club.

International career

Youth
With five goals, Milošević was the top scorer of 2022 UEFA European Under-17 Championship in which Serbia reached the semi-finals, where they lost to the Netherlands on penalties. He scored a goal in every game he played.

Career statistics

Honours
Individual
UEFA European Under-17 Championship top scorer: 2022

References

External links
 
 

2005 births
People from Čačak
Sportspeople from Čačak
Living people
Serbian footballers
Serbia youth international footballers
Association football forwards
FK Vojvodina players
Serbian SuperLiga players